is a Japanese triathlete. She finished in second place at the 2014 ITU Triathlon World Cup event in Jiayuguan.

References

External links
 

1987 births
Living people
Japanese female triathletes
Place of birth missing (living people)
Triathletes at the 2016 Summer Olympics
Olympic triathletes of Japan
20th-century Japanese women
21st-century Japanese women